Will Liu (born 7 October 1972) is a Taiwanese singer, dancer and composer.

Background
He is well known for his album Caihong Tiantang (彩虹天堂; "Rainbow Heaven") and is known as good friends with Taiwanese artists Jay Chou and Show Lo.

Liu's second album: City of Angels (天使之城) was released on 18 May 2007. There are 11 new songs including "幸福的距离" in this album. Almost all the songs are written by him personally.

Liu appeared in the movie Initial D (頭文字D, 23 June 2005), playing a minor role as an obnoxious professional racer, complete with outlandish dreadlocks, who picks and loses a street race with the protagonist, played by Jay Chou. He went on to land a major role in the movie Kung Fu Dunk, again as an enemy of Jay Chou's character – specifically, as the captain of a basketball team that wins games with all sorts of foul play.

Liu was formerly part of a Taiwanese boy band called "SBDW". He enjoys playing basketball and weight training.

Liu is a devout Christian and a member of the New Life Church, a Charismatic Christian church in Taipei, Taiwan. Taiwanese tabloids have reported his evangelical outreaches to other figures in the Taiwan show business, including A-Mei, Jay Chou, and F.I.R.

Liu is currently working on a new album to be released later in 2010. It will feature songs from Jay Chou, Wing, Transition(U.K), and JJ Lin.

Filmography

Films
Scandals (2013)
Zombie-108 (2012)
Common Heroes (2012)
True Legend (2010)
The Treasure Hunter (2009)
Kung Fu Dunk (2008)
Initial D (2005)
Unbeatable (2013)

Television
The Biggest Loser (2013)
Pandamen (2010)
Sonic Youth (2002)
Meteor Garden 2 (2002)
Poor Prince Taro (2001)

References

External links 
Wretch Blog

1972 births
Living people
Taiwanese male film actors
Taiwanese singer-songwriters
Taiwanese Christians
Taiwanese Charismatics
Taiwanese male television actors
Male actors from Kaohsiung
21st-century Taiwanese male actors
Musicians from Kaohsiung
Writers from Kaohsiung
21st-century Taiwanese male  singers